is an arcade game released by Data East in 1986. The game is a vertical scrolling shoot 'em up like Xevious, but as the title indicates, Charles Darwin's theory of evolution is incorporated into the gameplay.

Setting & design
The game takes place within a gigantic spaceship which has virtually infinite capacity because of its ability to manipulate time and space. The player must deal with enigmatic creatures called EVOL, which consist only of pure energy and need to keep themselves in capsules in order to maintain their existence in the world.

All of the characters in the game are designed to resemble microscopic organisms, both in their appearance and their quick, tricky movements. The player's ship undergoes over 10 types of transformations throughout the game, each with offensive and defensive maneuvers specific to their design. The sound effects used are minimal, but different types of sounds are used according to the type of shots or their speed. A sound resembling a long scream results when the player's ship is hit and returns to its weakest evolutionary state. The game's designer, graphic designer, and music composer, Tomo Furukawa, would go on to become the vocalist of the band Guniw Tools.

Gameplay

The player must progress through 16 different levels, defeating the boss at the end of each level. The player controls their ship using an 8-way joystick and 2 buttons (one button targets enemies in the air, and the other targets the enemies on the ground). The power of the player's ship increases as it evolves.

There are two broad categories that define how enemies attack. The first type only shoots in the forward direction at a constant speed, but the second type shoots bullets that travel at different speeds depending on its distance with the player's ship (the bullets travel quicker if the player is farther away, and slower if the player is close by). This made it so that staying away from enemies would not necessarily make it easier to avoid attacks. The game's difficulty also does not change over time, and enemies do not become stronger as the player's ship evolves. This style was continued in the game's sequel.

Once the player reaches 2,000,000 points, they gain a bonus of 2,000,000 points, and a bonus of 3,000,000 points once they reach 3,000,000 points. This bonus system allows the player to reach 10,000,000 points after gaining only 5,000,000 points, but the game's counter does not display digits in the ten millions. Destroying 16 ground enemies in a row in the desert level extends gameplay without having to insert additional credits.

Evolution system
The biggest characteristic of the game is the evolution of the player's ship. The ship starts out in a form called BEAS, and evolves when the player collects EVOL capsules, which appear when certain enemies are killed. The player's ship grows in size and strength as it evolves, but certain forms may be difficult to use effectively, so the player must pace the evolution properly in order to succeed. There are 19 different evolutionary forms in total.

The ship's attacks that target airborne enemies gradually increase in strength as the ship evolves, but the attacks against enemies on the ground cannot be improved in the same way. Hitting the airborne  and  enemies with a certain number of shots causes them to get knocked out, and the player's ship can dock into these enemies for a short period of time while they are knocked out. The ship's attacks against enemies on the ground increase in strength during this period. However, some ground enemies cannot be killed during this power-up. No further power-ups exist for attacks against enemies on the ground. The giant version of Zanzō cannot be knocked out, so the player cannot use it to improve their ground attack.

Devolution
Players must collect EVOL capsules frequently in order to advance to the strongest evolutionary forms. Failing to collect a capsules during a certain period of time causes the ship to gradually "devolve" one level at a time. However, the devolution timer is stopped while the ship is docked with an enemy character as explained above.

The player's ship devolves into the weakest form, PISTER (one rank below BEAS), if it is hit by an enemy attack (this does not apply if the ship is in the BLACK DEAME or SUPPURATE forms). The farther up the ship is on the evolutionary chain when it gets hit, the longer the animation is for the ship to devolve. Though coming into contact with any of the enemies normally results in an instant loss, the ship is invincible while the devolution animation lasts, and the player may kill enemies by ramming into them. The player loses their ship only if they are hit by an enemy attack while they are in the weakest evolutionary form (PISTER), or if they crash into an enemy while the ship is not devolving.

Mutation
Several evolutionary forms cannot be achieved just by gathering capsules. Mutation occurs if the player is hit by an enemy attack while in a certain evolutionary stage (or if they devolve over time from a certain evolutionary stage), and the ship's attacks become highly stylized and powerful if used effectively.

Reverse evolution
Reverse evolution is another special form that occurs if the player is hit by an enemy attack after a specific set of normal evolutions. The reverse evolutionary form, BLACK DEAME, is bat-like, and bears a completely different appearance from any of the other forms. The ship is unaffected by enemy attacks, and packs an extraordinary amount of firepower as it shoots numerous smaller versions of itself as its main attack. However, if the player fails to collect an EVOL capsule during the allotted period of time, the ship immediately devolves into the weakest form, making the transformation a double-edged sword. It is impossible to maintain the BLACK DEAME form throughout the game by docking with enemies, since its attack power is so powerful that enemies die instantly rather than being knocked out.

Ports & related releases
Darwin 4078 was ported to the 2nd generation MSX in 1987 by Hudson Soft, and bore similar appearance to the arcade game B-Wings and the NES game Hector '87. A sequel titled  (also written as S.R.D.) was released by Data East in 1987, and was ported by Sega on April 8, 1990 for the Sega Mega Drive as Darwin 4081.  is not a direct sequel to the game, but bears similarities to Darwin as a side-scrolling action game developed by Data East that uses an evolution system. Darwin 4081 was numbered 4081 because it was the 4th game that used the evolution system after Darwin (4078), S.R.D. (4079), and Act-Fancer (4080). Other similar games include Bio-ship Paladin by UPL and Bermuda Triangle by SNK, which also feature ships that change appearance with power-ups.

Reception 
In Japan, Game Machine listed Darwin 4078 on their April 15, 1986 issue as being the third most-successful table arcade unit of the month.

References

External links
Darwin 4078 at Data East Games

Darwin 4078 at arcade-history
Evolution chart at Pole Position.com 

1986 video games
Arcade video games
MSX games
Data East video games
Nintendo Switch games
PlayStation 4 games
Vertically scrolling shooters
Video games about evolution
Video games developed in Japan
Data East arcade games
Hamster Corporation games